Imogen Hope Waterhouse (born 9 June 1994) is an English actress and model. She starred in the 2018 horror film Braid, and starred also in the American fantasy television series The Outpost for three seasons from 2018 to 2021.

Early life and education 
Waterhouse grew up in London. Her father is a plastic surgeon and her mother a nurse. She has two sisters and one brother; her older sister is Suki Waterhouse, who also works as an actress and model. In 2014 Waterhouse signed with Next Management, which also represents Suki. However, she decided to pursue a primarily acting-based career and trained at the Oxford School of Drama.

Career 
Since 2015 Waterhouse has appeared in guest roles in various TV series and had supporting roles in the 2016 thriller Nocturnal Animals and the 2017 film The Last Photograph. In 2018 she was cast in a leading role in the horror film Braid. Waterhouse was also cast in a starring role in the American fantasy television series The Outpost, in which she played Princess Rosmund, the last surviving member of an overthrown and murdered royal family. In 2019 Waterhouse appeared in the short film Rain Stops Play by Mika Simmons, playing a young American woman who becomes the love interest of a gallery owner in New York. In June 2022, she was cast in a starring role in the upcoming Apple TV+ drama television series The Buccaneers, based on the Edith Wharton novel.

Filmography

References

External links 
 

Living people
1994 births
English film actresses
English television actresses
English female models
21st-century English actresses
Actresses from London
Alumni of the Oxford School of Drama